The Airplane Service Station, also known as the Powell Airplane, is a service station built in 1930 in the shape of an airplane. Located at 6829 Clinton Highway in Powell, an unincorporated community in Knox County, Tennessee, it is on the National Register of Historic Places.

The station was built by brothers Elmer and Henry Nickle. Their intent was to increase business by having a service station that was visually unique, both to area residents and to travelers on newly widened U.S. Highway 25. Elmer Nickle had a strong interest in airplanes, and so the station was constructed in the Mimetic architectural style in the shape of an airplane.

The structure ceased being used as a service station in the 1960s, when it became a liquor store.  It has also been a produce stand, bait and tackle shop, a used car lot and a barber shop. Knox Heritage and a local organization, the Airplane Filling Station Preservation Association (AFSPA), are working to preserve the structure.

See also
 Teapot Dome Service Station, 1922 Zillah, Washington station built in the shape of a teapot
 Shell Service Station, 1930 Winston-Salem, North Carolina station built in the shape of a scallop shell

References

External links
 Roadside America
 National Register of Historic Places
 Image gallery
 Airplane Service Station, c. 1931 — McClung Digital Collection

Transport infrastructure completed in 1930
Buildings and structures in Knox County, Tennessee
Novelty buildings in the United States
Tourist attractions in Knox County, Tennessee
Transportation buildings and structures on the National Register of Historic Places in Tennessee
Retail buildings in Tennessee
Gas stations on the National Register of Historic Places in Tennessee
National Register of Historic Places in Knox County, Tennessee
1930 establishments in Tennessee